Events from the year 1707 in France.

Incumbents 
Monarch: Louis XIV

Events
April 25: Battle of Almansa, described as "probably the only Battle in history in which the English forces were commanded by a Frenchman, the French by an Englishman."
May 2–3: Action of 2 May 1707
July 29-August 21: Battle of Toulon: Prince Eugene is forced to abandon his attempt to take the naval port of Toulon
October 21: Battle at The Lizard

Births
January 8 - Louis, Dauphin of France, son of Louis of France, Duke of Burgundy (died 1712)
April 10 - Michel Corrette, organist and composer (died 1795)
Nicolas La Grange, playwright and translator (died 1775)

Deaths
February 26 - Louis Cousin, translator, historian, lawyer, royal censor and president of the cour des monnaies (born 1627)
April 24 - Bernard Desjean, Baron de Pointis, admiral and privateer (born 1645)
November 5 - Denis Dodart, physician, naturalist and botanist (born 1634)
Julie d'Aubigny, swordswoman and opera singer (born c.1670)

See also
War of the Spanish Succession

See also

References

1700s in France